Request is a cover album by Japanese recording artist Juju, released on September 29, 2010. The album features recordings of famous songs by Japanese female vocalists, mostly from the late 1990s.

Conception

The album was originally titled Juju Sings Beautiful Woman. After the album's announcement on August 4, a questionnaire was put up on Juju's website, asking fans which songs they wanted to hear Juju cover. Despite this, four songs had already been chosen for the album, "Gips," "Hello, Again (Mukashi Kara Aru Basho)," "Last Kiss" and "Time Goes By."

The album is Juju's second disc of covers, after the She Sings... second disc of her previous album Juju, which featured primarily covers of Western songs in English.

Promotion

"Last Kiss" was originally released in February 2010, as one of the A-side tracks of the four A-side single "Sakura Ame/Ready for Love/S.H.E./Last Kiss."

A cover of My Little Lover's "Hello, Again (Mukashi Kara Aru Basho)" sung by Juju was announced as a song used in an adverstising campaign for the Sony Alpha digital camera on June 4. The song was released digitally on June 16 as a ringtone and on June 23 as a full-length cellphone download, where it was extremely successful digitally, reaching #1 on the RIAJ Digital Track Chart. Due to this popularity, it was released as a physical single a month later, where it reached #15 on Oricon's physical charts.

Track listing

Chart rankings

Reported sales and certifications

Promotional tracks 

Many songs from the album were released prior to the physical release digitally, or through other means such as a physical CD or radio airplay.

*Ballad Version

Release history

References

External links
Sony Music Request profile 

2010 albums
Covers albums
Japanese-language albums
Juju (singer) albums
Onenation albums